Boronia repanda, commonly known as the granite rose, repand boronia or border boronia, is a plant in the citrus family Rutaceae and is endemic to an area near the eastern border between New South Wales and Queensland in Australia. It is a small erect, woody shrub with many branches, thick warty, oblong leaves and pink, rarely white flowers arranged singly in leaf axils.

Description
The eight stamens alternate in length with those near the sepals longer than those near the petals. The style is hairy.

Taxonomy and naming
The granite rose was first formally described in 1905 by Joseph Maiden and Ernst Betche from an unpublished description by Ferdinand von Mueller. They gave it the name Boronia ledifolia var. repanda and published the description in Proceedings of the Linnean Society of New South Wales from a specimen collected near Stanthorpe by John L. Boorman. In 1907 Maiden and Betche raised the variety to species status as Boronia repanda. The specific epithet (repanda) is a Latin word meaning "bent backwards" or "undulate".

Distribution and habitat
The granite boronia is known from nine populations in Granite Belt and Darling Downs areas of south-east Queensland and one population on the Northern Tablelands region of New South Wales near the Queensland border. It grows in heath and woodland on granite.

Conservation
Boronia repanda has been classified as "endangered" under the Australian Government Environment Protection and Biodiversity Conservation Act 1999, the Queensland Government Nature Conservation Act 1992 and the New South Wales Government Biodiversity Conservation Act 2016. The main threats are removal of undergrowth for fire reduction purposes, inappropriate fire regimes, and the limited number of surviving plants.

References 

repanda
Flora of New South Wales
Flora of Queensland
Plants described in 1905
Taxa named by Joseph Maiden
Taxa named by Ernst Betche